A steel roller coaster is a roller coaster that is defined by having a track made of steel. Steel coasters have earned immense popularity in the past 50 years throughout the world. Incorporating tubular steel track and polyurethane-coated wheels, the steel roller coasters can provide a taller, smoother, and faster ride with more inversions than a traditional wooden roller coaster.

Arrow Dynamics first introduced the steel roller coaster to feature tubular track to the thrill industry with their creations of the Matterhorn Bobsleds (Disneyland) in 1959 and the Runaway Mine Train (Six Flags Over Texas) in 1966.

As of 2006, the oldest operating steel roller coaster in North America is Little Dipper at Memphis Kiddie Park in Brooklyn, Ohio and has been operating since April 1952. The oldest operating steel rollercoaster in the world is Montaña Suiza at Parque de Atracciones Monte Igueldo (Spain). It has been operating since 1928.

Characteristics

Steel coasters have a generally smoother ride than their wooden counterparts and due to their strength rides can have more complex and faster turns and twists without injuring riders. However, some coaster enthusiasts prefer wooden coasters due to the jolting ride feeling more dangerous and giving a larger adrenaline rush.
Almost all world records for tallest, fastest, and longest coasters are currently held by steel roller coasters.
The fact that fewer supports are needed means steel roller coasters have made a large variety of features possible, such as loops, barrel rolls, corkscrews, zero-G rolls and beyond 90° drops.
Occasionally steel tracks are combined with wooden frames typical for wooden roller coasters. These are sometimes referred to as Hybrid Roller Coasters. In many cases these were originally wooden roller coasters whose original wooden track was later replaced by steel, while some are built in this fashion originally. Examples include Excalibur at Valleyfair, Gemini and Steel Vengeance at Cedar Point, Twisted Timbers at Kings Dominion, and New Texas Giant at Six Flags Over Texas.

There are different types of steel coasters, such as flying, inverted, floorless, and suspended.

Notable steel roller coasters

Alpengeist at Busch Gardens Williamsburg – world's tallest full-circuit inverted coaster
Banshee at King's Island – world's longest inverted coaster
Batman: The Ride at Six Flags Great America - first inverted roller coaster
GateKeeper at Cedar Point – world's tallest and fastest wing coaster, featured the highest inversion in the world when it opened
Matterhorn Bobsleds at Disneyland – first tubular steel roller coaster
Millennium Force at Cedar Point – first full-circuit roller coaster to exceed  in height
Mindbender at West Edmonton Mall's Galaxyland – world's largest indoor steel roller coaster
Ninja at Six Flags Magic Mountain – world's fastest suspended roller coaster
Riddler's Revenge at Six Flags Magic Mountain – world's tallest, fastest, and longest stand-up roller coaster
Runaway Mine Train at Six Flags Over Texas – first mine train roller coaster, built in 1966.
Superman: Escape from Krypton at Six Flags Magic Mountain - first roller coaster to exceed  in height
 The Smiler at Alton Towers - holds the world record for most inversions at 14
Takabisha at Fuji-Q Highland theme park in Fujiyoshida, Yamanashi, Japan - formerly the world's steepest roller coaster with a beyond-vertical drop of 121° opened in 2011
Tatsu at Six Flags Magic Mountain – world's tallest, fastest, and longest flying roller coaster
Top Thrill Dragster at Cedar Point - world's first full-circuit roller coaster to exceed  in height
Wonder Woman Golden Lasso Coaster at Six Flags Fiesta Texas – world's first steel monorail roller coaster.
X² at Six Flags Magic Mountain – world's first 4th Dimension roller coaster
Xcelerator at Knott's Berry Farm - world's first roller coaster to feature a hydraulic launch

Other examples

Corkscrew at Knott's Berry Farm (now at Silverwood) – first modern roller coaster to feature an inversion
Formula Rossa at Ferrari World – world's fastest roller coaster at 
Magnum XL-200 – first full-circuit roller coaster to exceed 
The New Revolution at Six Flags Magic Mountain – first modern roller coaster to feature a vertical loop
Steel Dragon 2000 – world's longest roller coaster at 
Impulse (roller coaster) - 540° Helix at Knoebels Amusement Resort in Pennsylvania
Yukon Striker at Canada's Wonderland - world's tallest dive coaster at 223 ft

References

Types of roller coaster